The Rudston Monolith at over  is the tallest megalith (standing stone) in the United Kingdom.  It is situated in the churchyard in the village of Rudston in the East Riding of Yorkshire.

Description
The stone is slender, with two large flat faces. The top appears to have broken off the stone. In 1773 the stone was capped in lead; this was later removed, though the stone is currently capped. The weight is estimated at 40 tonnes. The monolith is made of gritstone. The monument dates to the Late Neolithic or Early Bronze Age. A possible fossilised dinosaur footprint is said to be on one side of the stone, though a study by English Heritage in 2015 concluded that the claim was unsubstantiated.

There is one other smaller stone, of the same type, in the churchyard, which was once situated near the large stone. The Norman church was almost certainly intentionally built on a site already considered sacred, a practice common through the country – indeed the name of Rudston comes from the Old English "Rood-stane", meaning "cross-stone", implying that a stone already venerated was adapted for Christian purposes.

The many other prehistoric monuments in the area include four cursuses, three of which appear to converge on the site of the monolith.

Antiquarian accounts
Sir William Stukeley found "the dimensions of the monolith within ground as large as those without". Stukeley found many skulls during his dig and suggested they might have been sacrificial.

Thomas Waller states that in 1861 during levelling of the churchyard the surface of the ground near the monolith was raised .

See also
Menhir de Champ-Dolent in Brittany

References

External links

 Photos and history of the stone compiled by Mike Thornton

Prehistory of the East Riding of Yorkshire
Megalithic monuments in England
Stone Age sites in England
Archaeological sites in the East Riding of Yorkshire
Grade I listed buildings in the East Riding of Yorkshire
Bronze Age sites in the East Riding of Yorkshire